Azospirillum is a Gram-negative, microaerophilic, non-fermentative and nitrogen-fixing bacterial genus from the family of Rhodospirillaceae. Azospirillum bacteria can promote plant growth.

Characteristics 
The genus Azospirillum belongs in the alpha-Proteobacteria class of bacteria. Azospirillum are gram-negative, do not form spores, and have a slightly-twisted oblong-rod shape.  Azospirillum have at least one flagellum and sometimes multiple flagella, which they use to move rapidly. Azospirillum are aerobic, but many can also function as microaerobic diazotrophs, meaning, under low oxygen conditions, they can change inert nitrogen from the air into biologically useable forms. At least three species, A. melinis, A. thiophilum, and A. humicireducens are facultative anaerobes, and can live, if necessary, without oxygen. Growth of Azospirillum is possible between 5 °C and 42 °C and in substrates with a pH of 5 to 9, with optimal growth occurring around 30 °C and 7 pH. Microbiologists use nitrogen-free semi-solid media to isolate Azospirillum from samples.  The most commonly used media is called "NFb".

Discovery and reclassification 
The first species described in the genus was originally named Spirillum lipoferum in 1925 by M.W. Beijerinck.  In Brazil, during the 1970s, similar strains of this species were found associated with the roots of grain plants by scientists lead by Dr. Johanna Döbereiner.   Her group discovered that these bacteria had the ability to fix nitrogen. Due to this discovery, Spirillum lipoferum was reclassified in 1978 as Azospirillum lipoferum by Jeffery Tarrand, Noel Krieg, and Döbereiner, who also added Azospirillum brasilense to the genus.  By 2020, twenty-one species of Azospirillum had been described, most of which had been discovered after the year 2000.

Origin of name 
The prefix “Azo-” comes from the French word “azote”, which means nitrogen.  This prefix is used to denote the ability of the bacteria to fix atmospheric nitrogen.  The ending “-spirillum” refers to the shape of the bacteria which is similar to spiral-shaped bacteria in the genus Spirillum.

Ecological and agricultural significance 
Azospirillum are found in freshwater and soil habitats, especially in close relationships with plant roots.  Associations with plants are thought to be largely beneficial.  Over 113 species of plants in 35 different plant families have been documented to have benefited from association with a species of Azospirillum.  In addition to vascular plants, the growth of the algae Chlorella vulgaris was positively affected by the presence of Azospirillum. Since the 1970s, Azospirillum strains have been researched for their effects in improving agricultural yields and improving growth of wild plants.  In 2009, the first commercial inoculants containing Azospirillum came on the market, and by 2018, over 3 million doses were applied annually to crops by farmers, mainly in South America.

Plant growth promotion 

Azospirillum promote plant growth through a variety of mechanisms.  Many Azospirillum excrete plant hormones that alter how the roots of plants grow.  Affected roots frequently grow more branches and fine root hairs, which may help the plants acquire water and nutrients more efficiently. In addition to these changes, Azospirillum can also alter the forms of plant nutrients such as nitrogen and phosphorus to make them more available to plants. However, how much nitrogen Azospirillum contribute to crop plants via biological fixation is debated. Azospirillum also make antioxidants that protect the plant roots from stresses due to drought and flooding.

Plant growth can also be promoted indirectly by Azospirillum reducing plant disease.  Azospirillum competes with pathogens on the roots for space and for trace nutrients such as iron.  The plants' immune systems can also be primed by Azospirillum to resist attack by pathogens, a process known as induced systemic resistance.

Known species and genetic diversity 
Azospirillum genus harbor over than 20 described species. Despite the remarkable plant growth-promotion properties, less than half of Azospirillum species have the genome sequenced: A. brasilense, A. thiophilum, A. lipoferum, A. oryzae, A. palustre, A. doebereinerae, A. halopraeferens and several undescribed Azospirillum sp. strains. When accessing a phylogenetic tree with all Azospirillum genomes, it is possible to identify two monophyletic groups, one harboring exclusively A. brasilense strains and another the remaining species. This strongly suggests a higher differentiation of A. brasilense from the remaining strains. The second clade also has very high diversity and not enough resolution to determine strains species only using genetic data.

References

Further reading 

 
 
 
 
 

Rhodospirillales
Bacteria genera